Sally Line UK (sometimes referred to as Sally Ferries UK) was a British ferry operator on the English Channel and North Sea.

History
Sally Line was founded in 1981 by Michael Kingshott as a subsidiary of the Finland-based Rederi Ab Sally, and initially marketed as  Sally Viking Line, with a livery that was nearly identical with that of Viking Line, a Baltic Sea ferry consortium of which Sally was a member. The naming scheme of Sally's Viking Line ships was also carried over to the UK operations, with ships named either The Viking or Viking [number]. In 1987 Rederi Ab Sally, including the Sally Line UK operations, was sold to Effoa and Johnson Line, Sally's Baltic Sea rivals and owners of Silja Line. As a result of the change of ownership, a new Sally Line UK livery was adopted in 1988 and the company's ships were renamed with a Sally-prefix. Sally Line UK operated the Holyman Sally Line service from Port of Ramsgate to Ostend from 1993 to 1998, but this became no longer viable Holyman became partners with Hoverspeed and moved the service to Dover. In the mid-90s Sally Line adapted a new livery and a logo similar to that of Silja Line, but this proved short-lived as the company ceased operations in 1998.

Fleet

References

Notes

Bibliography

Defunct shipping companies of the United Kingdom
Transport companies established in 1981
Transport companies disestablished in 1997
1981 establishments in the United Kingdom
1997 disestablishments in the United Kingdom